Nyssus is a genus of corinnid sac spiders first described by Charles Athanase Walckenaer in 1805.

Species
 it contains fifteen species:
Nyssus albopunctatus (Hogg, 1896) — Australia (Northern Territory, New South Wales, Tasmania), New Zealand
Nyssus avidus (Thorell, 1881) — Australia (Queensland)
Nyssus coloripes Walckenaer, 1805 — Australia (mainland, Tasmania). Introduced to New Zealand
Nyssus emu Raven, 2015 — Australia (Queensland)
Nyssus insularis (L. Koch, 1873) — Fiji, Solomon Is.
Nyssus jaredwardeni Raven, 2015 — Australia (Queensland)
Nyssus jonraveni Raven, 2015 — Australia (South Australia, Queensland)
Nyssus loureedi Raven, 2015 — Australia (Lord Howe Is.)
Nyssus luteofinis Raven, 2015 — Australia (Queensland)
Nyssus paradoxus Raven, 2015 — Australia (Queensland)
Nyssus pseudomaculatus Raven, 2015 — Australia (Queensland, New South Wales)
Nyssus robertsi Raven, 2015 — Australia (Queensland)
Nyssus semifuscus Raven, 2015 — Australia (Queensland)
Nyssus wendyae Raven, 2015 — Australia (Queensland)
Nyssus yuggera Raven, 2015 — Australia (Queensland, New South Wales)

References

External links

Araneomorphae genera
Corinnidae